The Rail Rider  is a 1916 American silent drama film directed by Maurice Tourneur and starring House Peters, Bertram Marburgh, and Henry West. Prints and/or fragments were found in the Dawson Film Find in 1978.

The film's sets were designed by the art director Ben Carré.

Cast
 House Peters as Jim Lewis  
 Bertram Marburgh as 'B,' the enigma of the D & O  
 Henry West as Bill Carney  
 A. Harrington as Theodore C Barker  
 Zena Keefe as Mildred Barker

Preservation status
Fragmentary prints of The Rail Rider survive in the Library of Congress and the Dawson City collection of the Library and Archives Canada.<ref>[http://www.silentera.com/PSFL/data/R/RailRider1916.html Progressive Silent Film List: The Rail Rider] at silentera.com</ref>

References

Bibliography
 Waldman, Harry. Maurice Tourneur: The Life and Films''. McFarland, 2001.

External links

1916 films
1916 drama films
Silent American drama films
Films directed by Maurice Tourneur
American silent feature films
1910s English-language films
American black-and-white films
World Film Company films
1910s American films